The 2013 Motorsportwash.com European FIM Speedway Grand Prix will be the second race of the 2013 Speedway Grand Prix season. It took place on 20 April at the Polonia Bydgoszcz Stadium in Bydgoszcz, Poland.

Riders 

The Speedway Grand Prix Commission nominated Krzysztof Buczkowski as Wild Card, and Szymon Woźniak and Mikołaj Curyło both as Track Reserves. The draw will be made on 19 April.

Standing 
Championship standing before the event

References

See also 
 motorcycle speedway

Europe
2013
Grand
Speedway Grand Prix of Europe